The 2018 British Figure Skating Championships were held from 28 November to 4 December 2017 in Sheffield. Medals were awarded in the disciplines of men's singles, ladies' singles, pair skating, and ice dance at the senior, junior, and novice levels. The results were part of the selection criteria for the 2018 Winter Olympics, 2018 World Championships, 2018 European Championships, and the 2018 World Junior Championships.

Senior results

Men

Ladies

Pairs

Ice dance

International team selections

Winter Olympics
The figure skating event at the 2018 Winter Olympics was held on 9–23 February 2018 at the Gangneung Ice Arena in Gangneung, South Korea. Coomes / Buckland were the only British skaters to qualify Olympic spots.

World Championships
The 2018 World Figure Skating Championships were held on 19–25 March 2018 in Milan, Italy. Coomes / Buckland were forced to withdraw due to injury.

European Championships
The 2018 European Figure Skating Championships were held from 15–21 January 2018 in Moscow, Russia.

References

External links
 2018 British Championships results

British Figure Skating Championships, 2018
British Figure Skating Championships
Figure Skating Championships